Ramona Petzelberger (born 13 November 1992) is a German footballer who plays as a midfielder for Tottenham Hotspur in the FA Women's Super League. She previously played for Bundesliga club SGS Essen. In 2022 she was called to the Germany national team.

Club career
Petzelberger began her career at the Police Sports-Club (Polizei-Sportverein) Essen and later moved to FCR 2001 Duisburg. In 2008 she moved to the second division club SG Wattenscheid 09, for whom she scored four goals in 15 league games. Together with three team players, Petzelberger moved to SC 07 Bad Neuenahr for the 2009/10 season, where she won a regular place straight away. In the Bundesliga she made her debut on 20 September 2009 against Tennis Borussia Berlin; the first goal followed on 10 October 2009 against SC Freiburg.

Petzelberger signed for Bayer 04 Leverkusen for the 2012/13 season. On 19 April 2017, the native Essenerin announced her return to the Ruhr area to the SGS Essen. There, she extended her contract to June 2020. The first and third year were overshadowed for Petzelberger from long injury time. Nevertheless, Ramona Petzelberger played a key role in reaching the DFB Cup final in the final phase of the 2019/20 season (assist in the quarter-final against Turbine Potsdam and leading goal in the semi-final against Bayer 04 Leverkusen). In July 2020 she left SGS Essen.

Petzelberger signed for Aston Villa in July 2020. In 2022 she joined Tottenham Hotspur.

International career
Petzelberger won the 2009 UEFA European Under-17 Championship with the U-17 national team. With the U-19 national team, she reached the semi-finals at the 2010 U-19 European Championship. Petzelberger was also nominated for the 2010 FIFA U-20 World Cup that took place in the same year but had to cancel because of an injury.

From 30 May to 11 June 2011 she took with the team at the U-19 Championship in Italy in part and led the team as captain until the finale, the 8–1 was won against the selection of Norway, while the 4–0 met. After the tournament, Petzelberger was voted "Golden Player" of the finals by UEFA.

Petzelberger captained the squad at the 2012 U-20 World Cup in Japan, finishing in sixth place at the tournament. All three group games was the U-20 team for opt (against China 4–0, Ghana 1–0, and USA 3–0) and drew with nine points and a goal difference of 8–0 goals in the quarter-finals. This was won by the team with Petzelberger against the selection from Norway 4–0. In the semi-finals, the team met host nation Japan; the German team won 3–0 and moved into the final against the United States, which was lost 1–0. Ramona Petzelberger played all encounters over 90 minutes. On the 14th of February 2022 she was called up to Germany national team for the Arnold Clark cup 2022.

Honors and awards
 2007: German B youth champion
 2009: U-17 European champion
 2011: U-19 European champion
 2012: U-20 vice world champion
 Golden player of the 2011 European Under-19 Championship
 Fritz Walter Medal 2010 in silver

References

External links

 Ramona Petzelberger in the database of the German Football Association
 Aston Villa player profile
 Ramona Petzelberger in the database of fussballdaten.de
 

Living people
1992 births
SGS Essen players
Aston Villa W.F.C. players
Women's Super League players
Frauen-Bundesliga players
Bayer 04 Leverkusen (women) players
SC 07 Bad Neuenahr players
German women's footballers
German expatriate women's footballers
Germany women's youth international footballers
Women's association football midfielders
Expatriate footballers in England
German expatriate sportspeople in England
Footballers from Essen
Tottenham Hotspur F.C. Women players